Blackout period may refer to:

 a term used in context of Employee stock option Valuation
 alternative phrase for Election silence